Kunnash al-Haik is a songbook composed by Mohammed al-Haik in the late 18th century. "joy of the instrument"), popularly referred to as Andalusi music.

Editions 
The vizier  of the court of Hassan I released a derivative work known as Kunnash al-Jāmi'i. Abdelkrim Rais published an edition under the name Min Wahi r-Rabāb in 1989.

 also published a revised edition of Kunnash al-Haik.

References 

Song books
Moroccan literature
Moroccan music
Andalusian music
Arabic poetry
Moroccan poetry
18th century in Morocco